Manlio Fabio Altamirano (also, Manlio Favio Altamirano and Altamirano) is a town in the Mexican state of Veracruz. 
It serves as the municipal seat for the surrounding municipality of the same name.

References

External links 

  Municipal Official Site
  Municipal Official Information

Populated places in Veracruz